Bartemius Crouch may refer to:

Bartemius "Barty" Crouch, Sr., a fictional politician in the Harry Potter series
Bartemius "Barty" Crouch, Jr., Death Eater, son of the above character